Listed below are the UCI Women's Teams that competed in road bicycle racing events organized by the International Cycling Union (UCI) in 2011.

Teams overview

Riders
All ages as of 1 January 2011.

Kuota Speed Kueens

Lotto–Honda Team
Ages as of 1 January 2011.

TopSport Vlaanderen 2012–Ridley Team
Ages as of 1 January 2011.

Juvederm–Specialized

Bizkaia–Durango
Ages as of 1 January 2011.

Bebabarrena-Gipuzkoa

Lointek
Ages as of 1 January 2011.

Asptt Dijon–Bourgogne

Team GSD Gestion

Vienne Futuroscope

Team Garmin–Cervélo

Abus–Nutrixxion

China Chongming–Giant Pro Cycling
Ages as of 1 January 2011.

Colavita Forno D'Asolo

Gauss

Kleo Ladies Team

S.C. Michela Fanini Rox

SC MCipollini–Giordana

Top Girls Fassa Bortolo

Vaiano Solaristech

AA Drink–leontien.nl

Ages as of 1 January 2011.

Dolmans Landscaping Team

As of 1 January 2011. Ages as of 1 January 2011.

Nederland Bloeit

Hitec Products UCK

Alriksson–Go:Green

Diadora–Pasta Zara

HTC Highroad Women

Ages as of 1 January 2011.

TIBCO–To The Top

References

2011 in women's road cycling
2011
 
2011 UCI Women's Road World Cup